Gymnastics competitions at the 2014 Commonwealth Games in Glasgow, Scotland, was held from 24 July to 1 August at the SSE Hydro arena at the Scottish Exhibition and Conference Centre.

Medal table

Medal summary

Artistic
Men's Events

Women's Events

Rhythmic

Participating nations

Artistic 
The following nations participated in Artistic Gymnastics at the 2014 Commonwealth Games

  (10)
  (1)
  (10)
  (1)
  (6)
  (10)
  (10)
  (8)
  (1)
  (1)
  (7)
  (3)
  (10)
  (6) 
  (1)
  (10)
  (10)
  (7)
  (5)
  (3)
  (10)

Rhythmic 
The following nations participated in Rhythmic Gymnastics at the 2014 Commonwealth Games

  (3)
  (3)
  (1)
  (2)
  (3)
  (3)
  (3)
  (2)
  (3)
  (3)
  (3)
  (3)

See also
Gymnastics at the 2014 Summer Youth Olympics

References

External links
Official results book – Gymnastics (Artistic)
Official results book – Gymnastics (Rhythmic)

 
2014 Commonwealth Games events
C
2014
Gymnastics in Scotland
International gymnastics competitions hosted by the United Kingdom